Mohamad Tamer Mamdouh Rashid (born 15 January 1988 in Aleppo, Syria) is a Syrian footballer. He currently plays for Al-Shorta, which competes in the Syrian Premier League the top division in Syria. He plays as a striker, wearing the number 31 jersey for Al-Shorta. A product of Al-Ittihad's youth system, he made his first-team breakthrough under manager Oscar Fulloné during the 2007–08 season.

He helped Al-Ittihad reach the final of the AFC Cup the second most important association cup in Asia. Al-Ittihad won the final against Kuwaiti Premier League champions Al-Qadsia after penalties. The game was tied 1–1 after regular time and Extra Time.

Honour and Titles

Club 
Al-Ittihad
 Syrian Cup: 2011
 AFC Cup: 2010

References 

1988 births
Living people
Sportspeople from Aleppo
Syrian footballers
Association football forwards
Al-Ittihad Aleppo players
AFC Cup winning players
Syrian Premier League players